Michał Zieliński (born 6 May 1984) is a Polish retired footballer who played as a forward.

Career

Club
In January 2007, he moved to Polonia Bytom from Concordia Knurów. In February 2010, he joined Korona Kielce. In the summer 2010, he was loaned to GKS Katowice on a one-year deal. In January 2012, he moved to Górnik Zabrze on a loan deal lasting until June 2012.

International
He once played for Poland national football team in 2008.

References

External links
 
 

1984 births
People from Gliwice County
Sportspeople from Silesian Voivodeship
Living people
Polish footballers
Poland international footballers
Association football forwards
Concordia Knurów players
Polonia Bytom players
Korona Kielce players
GKS Katowice players
Górnik Zabrze players
MKS Cracovia (football) players
Ekstraklasa players
I liga players
II liga players
III liga players